Galeon may refer to:
 Galeon, a web browser
 Galeon (molecule), a cyclic diarylheptanoid
 William Galeon (died 1507), a learned English Augustinian

See also 
 Galleon (disambiguation)